The American Board of Colon and Rectal Surgery (ABCRS) is a member of the American Board of Medical Specialties that issues certificates for practitioners of Colorectal surgery.

The board was established in 1934 as the American Board of Proctology.

See also
 American Osteopathic Board of Proctology

References

External links 
 American Board of Colon and Rectal Surgery

Surgical organizations based in the United States
Colorectal surgery